Little Camas Dam is an earthfill type dam on Little Camas Creek, in Elmore County, Idaho, United States. The dam is owned by the Mountain Home Irrigation District and does not produce electricity. The reservoir is surrounded primarily by Boise National Forest land but also state and private land.

References

Dams in Idaho
Buildings and structures in Elmore County, Idaho
Dams completed in 1912
Earth-filled dams
1912 establishments in Idaho